Machikou Area is an area and a town inside of Changping District, Beijing, China. Machikou shares border with Chengnan and Chengbei Subdistricts to its north, Nanshao and Shahe Towns to its east, Shangzhuang and Yangfang Towns to its south, and Nankou Town to its west and north. The population for this area was 87,506 as of 2020.

This area's name Machikou is referring to the region's past location as a stopping for trading caravans.

History

Administrative divisions 
As of the year 2021, Machikou Area had 22 subdivisions, in which 1 was a community, and 21 were villages:

Gallery

See also 

 List of township-level divisions of Beijing

References 

Changping District
Towns in Beijing